Frank E. Schaeffer (February 1, 1905 – November 3, 1977) was a member of the Wisconsin State Assembly.

Biography
Schaeffer was born on February 1, 1905, in Milwaukee, Wisconsin. He went on to be a painting contractor.

Political career
Schaeffer was first elected to the Assembly in 1944 and remained a member until 1955. He was later elected again in 1958 and stayed in office until 1968. Schaeffer was a Democrat.

References

1977 Wisconsin Assembly Joint Resolution 89

Politicians from Milwaukee
Democratic Party members of the Wisconsin State Assembly
1905 births
1977 deaths
20th-century American politicians